Roland Ernst Wolf Kaiser (9 April 1943 – 4 January 1998) was a German actor. He appeared in 27 films and television series between 1954 and 1997. He also worked as a voice actor, dubbing foreign films for release in Germany.

Filmography

External links 
 

1943 births
1998 deaths
German male film actors
20th-century German male actors
German male voice actors